Dierdorf is a surname. Notable people with the surname include:

Dan Dierdorf (born 1949), American sportscaster and football player
Traude Dierdorf (1947–2021), Austrian politician